Gretna Green is a parish in the southern council area of Dumfries and Galloway, Scotland, on the Scottish side of the border between Scotland and England, defined by the small river Sark, which flows into the nearby Solway Firth. It was historically the first village a traveller would come to in Scotland when following the old coaching route from London to Edinburgh. Gretna Green railway station serves both Gretna Green and Gretna. The Quintinshill rail disaster, the worst rail crash in British history, in which over 220 died, occurred near Gretna Green in 1915.

Gretna Green sits alongside the main town of Gretna. Both are accessed from the A74(M) motorway.

Gretna Green is most famous for weddings. The Clandestine Marriages Act 1753 prevented couples under the age of 21 marrying in England or Wales without their parents' consent. As it was still legal in Scotland to marry without such consent, couples began crossing the border into Scotland to marry.

Marriage

Gretna's "runaway marriages" began in 1754 when Lord Hardwicke's Marriage Act came into force in England. Under the Act, if a parent of a person under the age of 21 objected to the minor's marriage, the parent could legally veto the union. The Act tightened the requirements for marrying in England and Wales but did not apply in Scotland, where it was possible for boys to marry at 14 and girls at 12 with or without parental consent (see Marriage in Scotland). It was, however, only in the 1770s, with the construction of a toll road passing through the hitherto obscure village of Graitney, that Gretna Green became the first easily reachable village over the Scottish border.

Scottish law allowed for "irregular marriages", meaning that if a declaration was made before two witnesses, almost anybody had the authority to conduct the marriage ceremony. The blacksmiths in Gretna became known as "anvil priests", culminating with Richard Rennison, who performed 5,147 ceremonies. The local blacksmith and his anvil became lasting symbols of Gretna Green weddings.

Victorian chronicler Robert Smith Surtees described Gretna Green at length in his 1848 New Monthly Magazine serial, The Richest Commoner in England: 
 
Few of our readers—none we should think of our fair ones—but at some period or other of their lives, have figured to themselves the features of Gretna Green. Few we should think but have pictured to themselves the chaise stained "with the variations of each soil", the galloping bustle of the hurrying postboys, urging their foaming steeds for the last stage that bears them from Carlisle to the border. It is a place whose very name is typical of brightening prospects. The poet sings of the greenest spot on memory's waste, and surely Gretna Green was the particular spot he had under consideration. Gretna Green! The mind pictures a pretty straggling, half Scotch, half English village, with clean white rails, upon a spacious green, and happy rustics in muffin caps, and high cheek bones, looking out for happier couples to congratulate. Then the legend of the blacksmith who forged the links of love, added interest to the place, and invested the whole with fairy feature.

How much better, brighter, more promising, in short, a Gretna Green marriage sounds than a Coldstream or Lamberton toll-bar one! and yet they are equally efficacious. Gretna Green indeed, is as superior in reality as it is in name. It looks as if it were the capital of the God of Love, while the others exhibit the bustling, trading, money-making pursuits of matter-of-fact life. Though we dare say Gretna Green is as unlike what most people fancy, still we question that any have gone away disappointed. It is a pretty south country-looking village, much such as used to exist in the old days of posting and coaching. A hall house converted into an hotel, and the dependents located in the neighbouring cottages. Gretna Hall stands a little apart from the village on the rise of what an Englishman would call a gentle eminence, and a Scotchman a dead flat, and is approached by an avenue of stately trees, while others are plentifully dotted about, one on the east side, bearing a board with the name of the house, the host and high-priest, "Mr. Linton". There is an air of quiet retirement about it that eminently qualifies it for its holy and hospitable purpose.

Since 1929, both parties in Scotland have had to be at least 16 years old, but they still may marry without parental consent. Since April 2022 in England and Wales, the minimum age for marriage is now 18 irrespective of parental consent. Of the three forms of irregular marriage that had existed under Scottish law, all but the last were abolished by the Marriage (Scotland) Act 1939, which came in force from 1 July 1940. Prior to this act, any citizen was able to witness a public promise.

Gretna's two blacksmiths' shops and countless inns and smallholding became the backdrops for tens of thousands of weddings. Today there are several wedding venues in and around Gretna Green, from former churches to purpose-built chapels. The services at all the venues are always performed over an iconic blacksmith's anvil.

Elsewhere 
In common law, a "Gretna Green marriage" came to mean, in general, a marriage transacted in a jurisdiction that was not the residence of the parties being married, to avoid restrictions or procedures imposed by the parties' home jurisdiction.  A notable "Gretna" marriage was the second marriage in 1826 of Edward Gibbon Wakefield to the young heiress Ellen Turner, called the Shrigley abduction (his first marriage was also to an heiress, but the parents wanted to avoid a public scandal). Other towns in which quick, often surreptitious marriages could be obtained came to be known as "Gretna Greens". In the United States, these have included Elkton, Maryland, Reno and, later, Las Vegas.

In 1856 Scottish law was changed due to a measure passed in Parliament by Alexander Colquhoun-Stirling-Murray-Dunlop to require 21 days' residence for marriage, and a further law change was made in 1940. The residential requirement was lifted in 1977. Other Scottish border villages used for such marriages were Coldstream Bridge, Lamberton, Mordington and Paxton Toll, and Portpatrick for people coming from Ireland.

In popular culture
 In Pride and Prejudice by Jane Austen, when Lydia Bennet elopes with George Wickham she leaves behind a note stating that their intended destination is Gretna Green, though later they are found cohabitating in London, having not in fact travelled to Scotland.
 In Season 3, Episode 5 of the BBC series You Rang, M'Lord?, two of the characters elope to Gretna Green. This then prompts two other characters to elope in a similar manner. However, they are stopped before they reach Scotland.
 In Season 6, Episode 20 of the BBC series Waterloo Road, student Jonah Kirby elopes with teacher and Head of Spanish, Francesca 'Cesca' Montoya, to Gretna Green in order to get married.
 In Season 2, Episode 7 of the BBC series Downton Abbey, Lady Sybil Crawley tries to elope to Gretna Green with chauffeur Tom Branson.
 In Episode 3 of the ITV series Doctor Thorne, adapted from the Anthony Trollope novel of the same name, the character Frank makes a joke about him and Mary running off to marry in Gretna Green.
 In Season 5, Episode 6 of the BBC series Poldark, Geoffrey Charles and Cecily Hanson try to flee to Gretna Green.
 In Season 1 of the Netflix series Bridgerton, Colin Bridgerton and Marina Thompson plan to run away to Gretna Green for a quick wedding, though the scheme ultimately falls through.
 In Half A Sixpence [Musical] the two main characters (Arthur Kipps and Ann) marry at Gretna Green.
 Gretna Green is revealed to be the hometown of the character James Spooner in Season 6 Episode 1 of the podcast My Dad Wrote a Porno.

See also
 Ower Bogie, an expression used in Scotland to describe a wedding conducted by a magistrate 
 Peak Forest, a village in England known as the 'Gretna Green of Derbyshire' because marriages could be performed without banns
 Las Vegas weddings, where marriage licences are easy and quick to obtain
 Gretna Green railway station, the local railway station reopened in 1993

References

Further reading
  — 1:50,000 scale (1.25 inches to 1 mile).

Villages in Dumfries and Galloway
Marriage, unions and partnerships in Scotland
Anglo-Scottish border
Blacksmith shops